Mark Hughes (born 1963) is a Welsh football manager and former international player.

Mark Hughes may also refer to:

Mark Hughes (basketball) (born 1966), American basketball player and coach
Mark Hughes (Emmerdale), fictional character on the ITV soap opera Emmerdale
Mark Hughes (footballer, born 1962), Welsh football player for Tranmere
Mark Hughes (footballer, born 1983), Northern Ireland international football player
Mark Hughes (footballer, born 1986), English football player for Accrington Stanley
Mark Hughes (footballer, born 1993), Irish footballer
Mark Hughes (fighter) (born 1973), American former mixed martial arts fighter
Mark Hughes (journalist), English Formula One journalist
Mark Hughes (politician) (1932–1993), MP for the city of Durham, 1970–1983
Mark Hughes (rugby league, born 1976), Australian rugby league footballer who played in the 1990s and 2000s
Mark Hughes (rugby league, born 1954), English-born Australian rugby league footballer who played in the 1970s and 1980s
Mark R. Hughes (1956–2000), founder of Herbalife, a multi-level marketing nutritional company
Mark Hughes (motorsport), British motorsport manager